The Austrian conductor Carlos Kleiber (1930–2004) only released nine studio recordings over the course of his five-decade career. He was famous for his elusiveness, often canceling concerts on short notice and appearing in only 96 orchestral concerts as well as about 620 opera performances. Equally as hesitant with recordings, Kleiber stated that "every unproduced record is a good record", and was described as not being able to "bear the thought of listeners sitting at home with a score in their hands… identifying every mistake". His nine studio recordings are of four operas and five symphonies published by Deutsche Grammophon, as well as a single piano concerto with EMI. Each became critically acclaimed in its own right, with those of Beethoven's 5th and 7th symphonies hailed as among the most outstanding classical music recordings ever made. Following his abandonment of the studio in 1982, Kleiber is represented by 75 live audio and 18 live video recordings, many of which are bootlegs; those of Der Rosenkavalier and the Vienna New Year's Concerts have been especially admired. Kleiber's contributions in the studio and stage have secured his place as one of the most important 20th century conductors.

Kleiber's first two studio recordings were abandoned before completion: a 1975 recording of Beethoven's Piano Concerto No. 5 with Arturo Benedetti Michelangeli and a 1979 recording of Puccini's La bohème at La Scala. His first success came in 1973 when he recorded Der Freischütz with Staatskapelle Dresden, followed by recordings with the Vienna Philharmonic (VPO) of Beethoven's Symphony No. 5 in 1975 and No. 7 in 1976. Both symphonies received much praise, with one reviewer commenting on the former that "it was as if Homer had come back to recite the Iliad". Around the mid-1970s Kleiber became closely associated with the Bavarian State Orchestra (BSO), and although they did not complete a recording of Berg's Wozzeck and Dvořák's Symphony No. 9, they released acclaimed recordings of Die Fledermaus by Johann Strauss in 1976 and Verdi's La traviata in 1977. Also in 1977, he also released a recording of Dvořák's Piano Concerto with the BSO and the pianist Sviatoslav Richter, making this his first and only studio recording with a soloist. Kleiber returned to the VPO in late 1978, and released recordings of Schubert's Symphony Nos. 3 and 8 the following year. He began recording both Brahms' Symphony No. 4 with the VPO and Tristan und Isolde with Staatskapelle Dresden in 1980. While the former would be released in 1981, the latter would continue recording until April 1982 when Kleiber walked out for unknown reasons. However, enough had been recorded to allow its release later that year; it was highly praised, particularly for the surprising but successful pick of the young Welsh soprano Margaret Price as Isolde.

His earliest surviving recordings is a 1960 live performance with the NDR Symphony Orchestra of the Suite in B flat major by Georg Philipp Telemann and the Cello Concerto in B flat major by Carl Philipp Emanuel Bach. As a whole, his recordings represent a limited repertoire; many recordings of the same piece, including nine recordings of both Beethoven's 4th and 7th symphonies and Der Rosenkavalier; eight recordings of Tristan und Isolde; six recordings of La bohème; and five recordings of the overture from Der Freischütz. Deutsche Grammophon released two collections in 2010 and 2014 of Kleiber's recordings under their label. Two posthumous documentaries on Kleiber were also released in 2010 and 2011.

Discography
 Private live recording
 Video not commercially available

Compilations

Posthumous documentaries

Notes
Casts

General

References

Bibliography
 
 

Discographies of classical conductors